Lindsey Weier (born July 2, 1984) is an American cross-country skier. She competed in three events at the 2006 Winter Olympics.

Cross-country skiing results
All results are sourced from the International Ski Federation (FIS).

Olympic Games

World Championships

World Cup

Season standings

References

External links
 

1984 births
Living people
American female cross-country skiers
Olympic cross-country skiers of the United States
Cross-country skiers at the 2006 Winter Olympics
Sportspeople from Saint Paul, Minnesota
21st-century American women